The bolívar  is the official currency of Venezuela. Named after the hero of Latin American independence Simón Bolívar, it was introduced following the monetary reform in 1879, before which the venezolano was circulating. Due to its decades-long reliance on silver and gold standards, and then on a peg to the United States dollar, it was considered among the most stable currencies and was internationally accepted until 1964, when the government decided to adopt a floating exchange rate instead.

Since 1983, the currency has experienced a prolonged period of high inflation, losing value almost 500-fold against the US dollar in the process. The depreciation became manageable in mid-2000s, but it still stayed in double digits. It was then, on 1 January 2008, that the hard bolívar (bolívar fuerte in Spanish, sign: Bs.F, code: VEF) replaced the original bolívar (sign: Bs; code: VEB) at a rate of Bs.F 1 to Bs. 1,000 (the abbreviation Bs. is due to the first and the final letters of the plural form of the currency's name, bolívares).

The value of the hard bolívar, pegged to the US dollar, did not stay stable for long despite attempts to institute capital controls. Venezuela entered another period of abnormally high inflation in 2012, which the country hasn't exited since. The central bank stuck to the pegged subsidised exchange rate until January 2018, which was overpriced so people began using parallel exchange rates despite a ban on publishing them. From 2016 to 2019 and again in 2020, the currency experienced hyperinflation for a total period of 38 months.

The rampant inflation prompted two redenominations. The first occurred in August 2018, when Bs.F 100,000 were exchanged for 1 sovereign bolívar (bolívar soberano in Spanish, sign: Bs.S, code: VES), and another one happened on 1 October 2021, but called "Nueva expresión monetaria" or new monetary expression, which removes 6 zeros from the currency without affecting its denomination but did introduce a new ISO code at a rate of Bs.S 1,000,000 = Bs.D 1, thus making Bs.D 1 worth Bs. 100,000,000,000,000 (1014, or Bs. 100 trillion in short scale)

Both currencies are in circulation, though the economy has undergone extensive currency substitution, so the majority of transactions happen in US dollars, or, to a lesser extent, the Colombian peso.

History

Bolívar

The bolívar is named after the hero of Latin American independence Simón Bolívar. The bolívar was adopted by the monetary law of 1879, replacing the short-lived venezolano at a rate of five bolívares to one venezolano. Initially, the bolívar was defined on the silver standard, equal to 4.5 g fine silver, following the principles of the Latin Monetary Union. The monetary law of 1887 made the gold bolívar unlimited legal tender, and the gold standard came into full operation in 1910. Venezuela went off gold in 1930, and in 1934, the bolívar exchange rate was fixed in terms of the US dollar at a rate of Bs. 3.914  = US$1, revalued to Bs. 3.18 = 1 US dollar in 1937, a rate which lasted until 1941. Until 18 February 1983 (now called , Spanish for Black Friday, by many Venezuelans), the bolívar had been the region's most stable and internationally accepted currency. It then fell prey to high devaluation.

Exchange controls were imposed on February 5, 2003, to limit capital flight. The rate was pegged to the US dollar at a fixed exchange rate of Bs. 1,600 to the dollar.

Hard bolívar

The government announced on 7 March 2007 that the bolívar would be redenominated at a ratio of 1,000 to 1 on 1 January 2008 and renamed the bolívar fuerte, or hard bolívar in an effort to facilitate the ease of transaction and accounting. The newer name literally means "hard bolívar", as in hard currency, and in reference to an old coin called the peso fuerte worth 10 Spanish reales. The alternate meaning of "strong" was also used by the government in promotional material The official exchange rate is restricted to individuals by CADIVI, which imposes an annual limit on the amount available for travel.

Since the government of Hugo Chávez established strict currency controls in 2003, there have been a series of five currency devaluations, disrupting the economy. On 8 January 2010, the value was changed by the government from the fixed exchange rate of Bs.F 2.15 to Bs.F 2.60 for some imports (certain foods and healthcare goods) and Bs.F 4.30 for other imports like cars, petrochemicals, and electronics. On 4 January 2011, the fixed exchange rate became Bs.F 4.30 for US$1.00 for both sides of the economy. On 13 February 2013 the hard bolívar was devalued to Bs.F 6.30 per US$1 in an attempt to counter budget deficits. On 18 February 2016, President Maduro used his newly granted economic powers to devalue the official exchange rate of the hard bolívar from Bs.F 6.30 per US$1 to Bs.F 10 per US$1, which is a 37% depreciation against the US dollar.

The hard bolívar entered hyperinflation in November 2016.

On February 5, 2018, the Central Bank of Venezuela announced a  devaluation, with the exchange rate going to Bs.F 25,000 per US$. This made the hard bolívar the second-least-valued circulating currency in the world based on the official exchange rate, behind only the Iranian rial, and between September 2017 and August 2018, according to the informal exchange rate, the hard bolívar was the least-valued circulating currency unit in the world.

The official exchange rate stood at Bs.F 248,832 to US$1 as of August 10, 2018, making it the least-valued circulating currency in the world based on official exchange rates.

In June 2018, the government authorized a new exchange rate for buying, but not selling, currency. On August 13, 2018, the rate was Bs.F 4,010,000 to US$1, according to ZOOM Remesas.

Sovereign bolívar  

On 22 March 2018, President Nicolás Maduro announced a new monetary reform program, with a planned revaluation of the currency at a ratio of 1,000 to 1. The change was to be made effective from 4 June 2018.

In May 2018, the government required prices to be expressed in both hard bolívares and sovereign bolívares at the then-planned rate of 1,000 to 1. For example, one kilogram of pasta was shown with a price of Bs.F 695,000 and Bs.S 695. Prices expressed in the new currency were rounded to the nearest 50 céntimos as that was expected to be the lowest denomination in circulation at launch. The rounding created difficulties because some items and sales qualities were priced at significantly less than Bs.S 0.50; for example a litre of gasoline and a Caracas Metro ticket typically cost Bs.S 0.06 and Bs.S 0.04, respectively.

The change in currency was originally scheduled for June 4, 2018.  The President delayed the planned June launch date of the sovereign bolívar, citing from Aristides Maza, "the period established to carry out the conversion is not enough". The revaluation was rescheduled to 20 August 2018, and the rate changed to 100,000 to 1, with prices being required to be expressed at the new rate starting 1 August 2018.

On 20 August 2018, the Maduro government launched the new sovereign bolívar currency, with Bs.S 1 worth Bs.F 100,000. New coins in denominations of 50 céntimos and Bs.S 1, and new banknotes in denominations of Bs.S 2, Bs.S 5, Bs.S 10, Bs.S 20, Bs.S 50, Bs.S 100, Bs.S 200 and Bs.S 500 were introduced. Under the country's official fixed exchange rate to the US dollar the new currency was devalued by roughly 95% compared to the old hard bolívar.  The day was declared a bank holiday to allow the banks to adjust to the new currency.  Initially, during a transition period the sovereign bolívar was to be run alongside the hard bolívar. However, from the start of the transition, on 20 August, hard bolívar notes of Bs.F 500 and less could not be used; only deposited at banks.

Concurrently with the release of the new currency, the minimum wage was raised to Bs.S 1,800 per month, a 33-fold increase, and sales tax increased from 12% to 16%.

Additionally, the sovereign bolívar is supposed to have a fixed exchange rate to the petro cryptocurrency, with a rate of Bs.S 3,600 to one petro; a peg of petro and sovereign bolívar was announced by Maduro as early as August 2018. The petro is supposedly tied to the price of a barrel of oil (about US$60 in August 2018). As of the end of August 2018, there is no evidence that the cryptocurrency is being traded. Petro is regarded by many as a scam.

Following the introduction of the sovereign bolívar, inflation increased from 61,463 percent on 21 August 2018 to 65,320 percent on 22 August 2018. By 24 August 2018, the introduction of the sovereign bolívar had not prevented hyperinflation. According to inflation analyst Steve Hanke, between 18 August and 21 August 2018, the inflation rate increased from 48,760% percent to 65,320%. In October 2021, the country will remove six zeroes from its currency while adapting a newer version of the bolivar currency system under a project known as "Digital bolivar".

Digital bolívar
A new bolívar, the digital bolívar, was introduced on 1 October 2021 at a rate of Bs.S 1,000,000 to Bs.D 1. This is not a replacement of the sovereign bolívar. The currency has the ISO 4217 currency code "VED".

Currency black market

The black (or parallel) market value of the hard bolívar and the sovereign bolívar has been significantly lower than the fixed exchange rate and other rates set by the Venezuelan government (SICAD, SIMADI, DICOM). In November 2013, it was almost one-tenth that of the official fixed exchange rate of Bs.F 6.30 per US dollar. In September 2014, the currency black market rate for the hard bolívar reached 100 VEF/USD; on 25 February 2015, it went over 200 VEF/USD. on 7 May 2015, it was over 275 VEF/USD and on 22 September 2015, it was over 730 VEF/USD. Venezuela still had the highest inflation rate in the world in July 2015. By 3 February 2016, this rate reached 1,000 VEF/USD. This rate surpassed 4,300 VEF/USD on 10 December 2016. It surpassed 10,000 VEF/USD on 28 July 2017, and on 7 September 2017, the rate surpassed 20,000 VEF/USD for the first time. Inflation accelerated, and on 1 December 2017, it reached 100,000 VEF/USD for the first time ever. The rate surpassed 200,000 VEF/USD on 18 January 2018, then 500,000 VEF/USD on 16 April, 1 million VEF/USD on 30 May, 2 million VEF/USD on 7 June, and 5 million VEF/USD on 16 August.

At the time of redenomination on 20 August 2018, the exchange rate was 59.21 VES/USD. By the end of the month it reached 87 VES/USD. The rate then surpassed 100 VES/USD on 3 October 2018, 1,000 VES/USD on 9 January 2019, 10,000 VES/USD on 19 July, 100,000 VES/USD on 6 April 2020, and reached the 1,000,000 VES/USD on 23 November 2020. According to DolarToday, the parallel exchange rate was 4,146,022 VES/USD as of 30 August 2021.

Exchange rate history
It is illegal to publish the "parallel exchange rate" in Venezuela. One popular website that has been publishing parallel exchange rates since 2010 is DolarToday, which has also been critical of the Maduro government. This table shows a condensed history of the parallel foreign exchange rate of the Venezuelan bolívar (hard and sovereign) to one United States dollar between 2012 and 2021, according to DolarToday.

Coins

Bolívar

In 1879, silver coins were introduced in denominations of Bs. , Bs. , Bs. 1, Bs. 2, and Bs. 5, together with gold Bs. 20. Gold Bs. 100 were also issued between 1886 and 1889. In 1894, silver Bs.  coins were introduced, followed by cupro-nickel 5 and  céntimos in 1896.

In 1912, production of gold coins ceased, whilst production of the Bs.5 ended in 1936. In 1965, nickel replaced silver in the 25 and 50 céntimos, with the same happening to the 1 and 2 bolívares in 1967. In 1971, cupro-nickel 10 céntimo coins were issued, the  céntimos having last been issued in 1958. A nickel Bs. 5 was introduced in 1973. Clad steel (first copper, then nickel and cupro-nickel) was used for the 5 céntimos from 1974. Nickel clad steel was introduced for all denominations from 25 céntimos up to 5 bolívares in 1989.

In 1998, after a period of high inflation, a new coinage was introduced in denominations of Bs. 10, Bs. 20, Bs. 50, Bs. 100 and Bs. 500.

The former coins were:

 Bs. 10
 Bs. 20
 Bs. 50
 Bs. 100
 Bs. 500
 Bs. 1,000 (minted 2005, issued late 2006, incorrectly rumoured as recalled due to official Coat of Arms change during the interval)

All the coins had the same design. On the obverse the left profile of the Libertador Simón Bolívar is depicted, along with the inscription "Bolívar Libertador" within a heptagon, symbolizing the seven stars of the flag. On the reverse the coat of arms is depicted, circled by the official name of the country, with the date and the denomination below. In 2001, the reverse design was changed, putting the denomination of the coin at the right of the shield of the coat of arms, Semi-Circled by the official name of the country and the year of its emission below.

Hard bolívar
Coins of the hard bolívar were in denominations of 1, 5, 10, 25, 50 céntimos, and Bs.F 1. They were quickly rendered obsolete by high inflation. It may be noticed that there was a -céntimo coin and a 1-céntimo coin, but no -céntimo coin. Therefore, giving correct change for a purchase of, say,  céntimos would require using a -céntimo coin and getting 8 céntimos back.

In December 2016, it was announced that coins of Bs.F 10, Bs.F 50, and Bs.F 100 would enter circulation. These three coins would replace the banknotes of the same denominations.

Sovereign bolívar
Sovereign bolívar coins were announced to be produced in denominations of 50 céntimos and Bs.S 1 (Bs.F 50,000 and Bs.F 100,000 respectively). These two coins were worthless by September 2019.

Banknotes

Bolívar
In 1940, the Banco Central de Venezuela began issuing paper money, introducing denominations of Bs. 10, Bs. 20, Bs. 50, Bs. 100 and Bs. 500. Bs. 5 notes were issued between 1966 and 1974, when they were replaced by coins. In 1989, notes for Bs. 1, Bs. 2 and Bs. 5 were issued.

As inflation took hold, higher denominations of banknotes started being introduced: Bs. 1,000 in 1991, Bs. 2,000 and Bs. 5,000 in 1994, and Bs. 10,000, Bs. 20,000 and Bs. 50,000 in 1998. The first Bs. 20,000 banknotes were made in a green color similar to the one of the Bs. 2,000 banknotes, which caused confusion, and new banknotes were made in a new olive green color.

Starting from 2000, banknotes ranging from Bs. 5,000 to Bs. 50,000 were renamed to REPÚBLICA BOLIVARIANA DE VENEZUELA instead of BANCO CENTRAL DE VENEZUELA on the obverse, after the 1999 constitution was adopted. Moreover, banknotes of Bs. 10,000, Bs. 20,000 and Bs. 50,000 were updated in April 2006 after the National Assembly approved changes to the coat of arms, which were made official on March 12, 2006.

The following is a list of former Venezuelan bolívar banknotes:

Hard bolívar

2008–2016 ("2007")
New banknotes of the series 2007–2015 with values of Bs.F 2 to Bs.F 100 were issued from 20 March 2007 until 5 November 2015 and became legal tender from 1 January 2008 to 20 August 2018. The greater the values, the longer re-issuing occurred. Only the Bs.F 50 and Bs.F 100 notes were re-issued in November 2015.

 Bs.F 2: March 20, 2007 to October 29, 2013
 Bs.F 5: March 20, 2007 to August 19, 2014
 Bs.F 10: March 20, 2007 to August 19, 2014
 Bs.F 20: March 20, 2007 to August 19, 2014
 Bs.F 50: March 20, 2007 to November 5, 2015
 Bs.F 100: March 20, 2007 to November 5, 2015

The obverse side is portrait-oriented, with the lower half carrying a portrait, while the reverse side is landscape-oriented, the left two thirds showing an animal in front of its habitat.

Re-issues retain the value-specific motifs, but the printing quality is different. The notes are printed by Casa de la Moneda Venezuela in Venezuela.

2016–17

High inflation, which was a part of Venezuela's economic collapse, caused the hard bolívar's value to plummet. The Bs.F 2 and Bs.F 5 notes were no longer found in circulation due to the hyperinflation, but remained legal tender. By December 2016, the Bs.F 100 note, the largest denomination, was only worth about US$0.23 on the black market.

On 7 December 2016, a new series of banknotes (recolors of the previous notes) in denominations of Bs.F 500, Bs.F 1,000, Bs.F 2,000, Bs.F 5,000, Bs.F 10,000, and Bs.F 20,000 were unveiled to the Venezuelan public. Days later on 11 December, President Nicolás Maduro who had been ruling by decree wrote into law that the Bs.F 100 would be pulled from circulation within 72 hours because "mafias" were allegedly storing those particular notes to drive inflation. With more than 6 billion Bs.F 100 notes issued consisting of 46% of Venezuela's issued currency, Maduro enacted an exchange for Venezuelan citizens to transfer all Bs.F 100 notes for Bs.F 100 coins while also blocking international travel to prevent the return of the bolívares that were supposedly stockpiled. The government justified the move claiming that the United States was working with crime syndicates to spirit away Venezuela's paper money to warehouses in Europe to cause the fall of the government. The government was thwarting this threat by withdrawing the notes from circulation. On 14 February 2017, Paraguayan authorities uncovered a 30-tonne stash of Bs.F 50 and Bs.F 100 notes totaling Bs.F 1.5 billion on its Brazilian border that had not yet been circulated. According to a United States Department of Defense adviser linked to The Pentagon, the Bs.F 1.5 billion was printed by Venezuela and destined for Bolivia, since unlike the implied exchange rate of thousands of hard bolívares equaling one United States dollar, the exchange rate was approximately 10 hard bolívares per dollar, making the value of the stash 419 times stronger, from US$358,000 to US$150 million. The Pentagon adviser further stated that the Venezuelan government tried to send the newly printed notes to be exchanged by the Bolivian government so Bolivia could pay 20% of its debt to Venezuela, and so Venezuela could use the US dollars for its own disposal.

On 3 November 2017, the Banco Central de Venezuela issued a Bs.F 100,000 note which is similar to the Bs.F 100 note of the 2007 series and the Bs.F 20,000 of the 2016 series, but with the denomination spelled out in full instead of adding an additional three zeros to the number 100. This denomination was worth US$2.42 using the unofficial exchange rate at the date of its release.

New banknotes of the 2016–17 series with values of Bs.F 500 to Bs.F 100,000 were issued from 7 December 2016 until 20 August 2018, the day when the sovereign bolívar was introduced. Notes from Bs.F 5,000 to Bs.F 100,000 were recently re-issued in December 2017.

 Bs.F 500: August 18, 2016 to March 23, 2017
 Bs.F 1,000: August 18, 2016 to March 23, 2017
 Bs.F 2,000: August 18, 2016
 Bs.F 5,000: August 18, 2016 to December 13, 2017
 Bs.F 10,000: August 18, 2016 to December 13, 2017
 Bs.F 20,000: August 18, 2016 to December 13, 2017
 Bs.F 100,000: September 7, 2017 to December 13, 2017,

Maduro has announced that after the currency redenomination has carried out on 20 August 2018, these old denominations with a face value of 1,000 hard bolívares or higher will circulate in parallel with the new series of sovereign bolívar notes and will continue to be used for a limited time. Banknotes with a face value below BsF. 1,000 were withdrawn from circulation and ceased to be legal tender on 20 August 2018. They have to be deposited in local banks.

2018
By May 2018, the hard bolívar's banknotes represented very little value and they had become in short supply. Weighing scales could no longer convert mass to price and receipts could no longer fit the numbers on their paper.

In June 2018, seven months after its release, the value of the Bs.F 100,000 note (largest denomination), had its value reduced by 98%, from US$2.42 (in November 2017) to US$0.05, as a result of increasing hyperinflation.

The lower denomination hard bolívar banknotes (up to Bs.F 500) were demonetized on 20 August 2018; with the introduction of the sovereign bolívar. Higher denominations (Bs.F 1,000 and above) remained legal tender during a transition period. On 30 November 2018, it was announced that the remaining denominations of the old currency will be withdrawn from circulation and cease to be legal tender on 5 December 2018.

Sovereign bolívar

2018
On 22 March 2018, with a declared state of emergency, a redenomination of the currency was announced. The conversion from hard bolívar to sovereign bolívar banknotes officially occurred on 20 August 2018, with new denominations of Bs.S 2, Bs.S 5, Bs.S 10, Bs.S 20, Bs.S 50, Bs.S 100, Bs.S 200, and Bs.S 500. Four months after entry into circulation, shops and state banks began refusing the Bs.S 2, as its value had significantly declined since the redenomination. By November 2019, except for the Bs.S 500, all notes issued in 2018 were worthless.

2019
Further inflation since the soberano redenomination resulted in the creation of Bs.S 10,000, Bs.S 20,000 and Bs.S 50,000 banknotes in June 2019. Not mentioning inflation, the Central Bank of Venezuela said the introduction of the new banknotes would "complement and optimize" the monetary system and that their purpose was to make payment systems "more efficient". On 23 April 2020, the exchange rate per xe.com was US$1 = 144,697.34 VES; the following day, the rate slid to US$1 = Bs.S 171,140.42.

Banknotes with a narrow segmented security thread were printed by Goznak, those with a wider one were printed elsewhere.

2020
As of December 2020, the highest denomination banknote (Bs.S 50,000) was worth less than US$0.05 and the minimum wage is Bs.S 1,200,000 (about US$1) per month. By September 2020, all sovereign bolivar banknotes (Bs.S 2 to Bs.S 500) issued on 20 August 2018 were deemed worthless. Venezuelan officials are planning a new Bs.S 100,000 note. Meanwhile, as of 16 December 2020, the exchange rate was over 1 million bolivares to one US dollar.

2021
On 5 March 2021, the Central Bank of Venezuela introduced 3 new denominations: Bs.S 200,000, Bs.S 500,000 and Bs.S 1,000,000 which were made available to the general public on 8 March 2021. The Bs.S 1,000,000 note was only worth US$0.52 at the time of the announcement.

By late May 2021 the exchange rate had risen to over 3 million sovereign bolívares to one US dollar.

According to a July 2021 Bloomberg article, Venezuela plans to redenominate the bolívar at a ratio of 1,000,000:1 in August 2021, effectively removing six zeros from the denominations. The current largest denomination banknote is 1,000,000 bolívares, expressed on the note with a predominant 1 followed by the descriptive millón de bolívares. It is therefore likely that the bank intends to retain the bolívar currency name while reusing the existing note designs.

Notes

See also
 Economy of Venezuela
 Hyperinflation in Venezuela
 SUCRE (currency)

References

Bibliography

External links
Current Legal Banknotes Venezuela
 Banknotes of Venezuela Gallery
Numismatic Catalog of Venezuela
History of Venezuelan Currency 
Currency Reconversion Calculator Bolívar Soberano to Bolívar Digital

Currencies of South America
Currencies of Venezuela
Currencies introduced in 1879